Laze pri Predgradu is a settlement on the left bank of the Kolpa River in the Municipality of Kočevje in southern Slovenia. The area is part of the traditional region of Lower Carniola and is now included in the Southeast Slovenia Statistical Region.

Name
The name of the settlement was changed from Laze to Laze pri Predgradu in 1955. In the past the German name was Geräuth.

Church
The local church is dedicated to Saint Vitus and belongs to the Parish of Stari Trg ob Kolpi. It is a late Romanesque single-naved building with a rounded apse and a belfry that was greatly rebuilt and refurbished over the centuries.

References

External links

Laze pri Predgradu on Geopedia

Populated places in the Municipality of Kočevje